Julie Marson (born 23 March 1965) is a British politician serving as an Assistant Government Whip since October 2022, having previously held the office from July to September 2022. A member of the Conservative Party, she also served as Parliamentary Under-Secretary of State for Employment between July 2022 and September 2022. She was elected as the Member of Parliament (MP) for Hertford and Stortford in the 2019 general election.

Early life and career
Marson was born in Barking, London and previously worked in finance. She was educated at Woodford County High School for Girls and Downing College, Cambridge. Prior to becoming an MP, she worked in corporate banking for NatWest.

Political career

Marson was previously a councillor on Thanet District Council in Kent, representing the Viking ward from 2011 to 2015. She has also served as a magistrate.

She contested the Labour-held East London seat of Dagenham and Rainham at the 2015 general election, finishing in third place. She stood again two years later, at the 2017 snap election, this time finishing in second place and increasing her vote share by 16%.

On 24 October 2019, the Hertford and Stortford Conservative Association chose Marson to succeed the incumbent MP Mark Prisk as their candidate in what has generally been considered a safe seat for the Conservative Party. At the general election on 12 December 2019, Marson was elected as the MP for Hertford and Stortford, with a majority of over 19,000.

After the 2022 government crisis, she was appointed Parliamentary Under-Secretary of State for Employment. She answered her first questions as a minister in the House of Commons on 11 July.

Political positions 
Marson supported Leave in the 2016 referendum on EU membership.

On 8 June 2020, she called for a global ban on wet markets.

Later that month, Marson called for LGBT+ conversion therapy to be banned, labelling it "morally and medically wrong."

Marson has supported the Turn on the Subtitles campaign, raising it at Prime Minister's Questions.

On 21 October 2020, she voted against an Opposition Day Motion to extend free school meals in England until Easter 2021.

Marson has supported initiatives promoting women in STEM and businesses.

Personal life 
Marson is married with a son. She also has a blonde cockapoo dog named Boris.

References

External links

1965 births
Living people
UK MPs 2019–present
21st-century British women politicians
Conservative Party (UK) MPs for English constituencies
People from Barking, London
People from Hertford
Alumni of Downing College, Cambridge
Female members of the Parliament of the United Kingdom for English constituencies
21st-century English women
21st-century English people